The Akaroa Marine Reserve is a marine reserve covering an area of  at the entrance to the Akaroa Harbour in New Zealand. It was approved in 2013 after a lengthy campaign, and established in 2014.

History
Forest and Bird carried out exploratory dives in the Akaroa Harbour in 1990. The Akaroa Harbour Marine Protection Society formal proposed the establishment of a  marine reserve in 1996.

Conservation Minister Kate Wilkinson declined the application for the reserve in 2010 on the grounds that it would adversely affect recreation fishing. The decision was challenged in the High Court and was quashed in a 2012 ruling. In terms of actual numbers the two separate consultation processes for the application had attracted more support than opposition.

In April 2013 Conservation Minister Nick Smith announced the approval of the reserve but at the reduced size of 475 ha. The size was reduced to take into account the concerns about customary and recreational fishing.  Subsequently, the size was finalised as 512 ha.

Ecology
The harbour as a whole has considerable natural values and fauna of the inner and outer harbour differs. There are pressures on the ecology from human activity such as settlements on the edge of the harbour and there is land and water-based industrial activity.

See also
 Marine reserves of New Zealand

References

External links

Akaroa Harbour Marine Reserve archive at the Department of Conservation
Map of the reserve
 

Marine reserves of New Zealand
Banks Peninsula
Protected areas of Canterbury, New Zealand
2013 establishments in New Zealand
Protected areas established in 2013
Akaroa